Tropical Storm Beryl was a deadly tropical storm which killed 3 people when it passed just south of the Cape Verde Islands. Beryl, the second named storm of the 1982 Atlantic hurricane season, developed out of a well organized tropical wave which was first noted near Dakar, Senegal on August 27. The wave was declared a tropical depression the next morning and upgraded it to a tropical storm later that same day. Beryl passed 35 mi (55 km) south of the island of Brava, Cape Verde by August 29. Beryl gradually intensified as it moved away from the islands and peaked just short of hurricane status on September 1 with peak winds of 72 mph (115 km/h). After peaking, Beryl quickly weakened to a tropical depression by the night of September 2. The depression continued on a general path towards the west until is dissipated on September 6 while located to the north of the Leeward Islands.

Meteorological history

Tropical Storm Beryl originated from a well developed tropical wave which was first noted off the eastern coast of Africa on August 27. The wave quickly organized and strengthened into Tropical Depression Two on the morning of August 28. The depression continued to intensify while moving towards the west-northwest, and was upgraded to a tropical storm that night, receiving the name Beryl. Tropical Storm Beryl that night while moving towards the west-northwest. After passing by the Cape Verde Islands, Beryl gradually intensified while moving steadily towards the northwest. On August 31, satellites depicted an eye feature developing within the deep convection of the storm. But, since the eye feature was located on the western side of the deep convection and the storm was slightly asymmetric, the intensity was held just below hurricane status. Only four hours later, strong wind shear from the west displaced the convection east of the center, leaving the low-level circulation exposed. Beryl weakened to a tropical depression the next day due to the lack of convection. The depression continued moving towards the west for the next three days without reintensification. This was determined to have been unrepresentative of the storms actual intensity as it was recorded in a squall line, a band of heavy rain and high winds, associated with Beryl. The depression became disorganized once more and by September 6, it was no longer identifiable on satellites.

Impact, naming, and statistics
While crossing through the Cape Verde islands, Beryl's rain and wind to caused moderate to heavy damage. The island of Brava, located on the southwest portion of the archipelago, was struck the hardest. In all, the storm killed 3 islanders and caused $3 million in damage (1982 USD). In the period after the storm's passage, the United States provided humanitarian aid and economic assistance to the country, helping the archipelago to reverse the effects of Beryl. Despite the death toll, the name Beryl was not retired and was re-used in 1988, 1994, 2000, 2006, 2012 and most recently in  2018 and is currently on the list of names for the 2024 Atlantic hurricane season.

See also

 Other storms named Beryl
 List of West Africa hurricanes
 Tropical Storm Christine (1973) – Easternmost-forming tropical or subtropical storm on record, until the formation of Subtropical Storm Alpha (2020)
 Hurricane Fred (2015) – Struck Cape Verde, causing significant damage

References

External links
 NHC Beryl Report
 Deadliest Atlantic Tropical Cyclones
 Beryl Best Track

1982 Atlantic hurricane season
Atlantic tropical storms